Agnete Loth (18 November 1921 – 2 June 1990) was an editor and translator of Old Norse-Icelandic texts. She is notable for editing late medieval romance sagas, which she published in five volumes intended "to provide a long-needed provisional basis for the study" of these sagas.

In 1975, she married the Icelandic philologist and poet Jón Helgason.

Selected works 
WorldCat lists 108 works associated with Agnete Loth. A selection of the most widely held includes:

References 

1921 births
1990 deaths
20th-century philologists